Peter Temin (born 17 December 1937) is an economist and economic historian, currently Gray Professor Emeritus of Economics, MIT and former head of the Economics Department.

Education
Temin graduated from Swarthmore College in 1959 before earning his Ph.D. at MIT in 1964.  Beginning in the 1960s and early 1970s he published on American economic history in the 19th century, including The Jacksonian Economy (1969) and Causal Factors in American Economic Growth in the Nineteenth Century (1975), as well as Reckoning with Slavery (1976), which was an examination of the slave economy and its effects. His papers of the 1960s would reflect intense empirical study as part of his working method, including composition of iron and steel products, which would later be part of his analysis of industrial development. He continued his study of 19th century industrialization with Engines of Enterprise.

Influence
Two of Temin's most cited conclusions in this area are on the relationship of labor scarcity to economic development, and the role of general equilibrium models in studying economic history. He would apply the conclusions drawn to his study of the business cycle in the 19th century.

The conclusions of his 1971 paper on Central Banks and Economic and Social Welfare programs foreshadowed what is probably his most influential and best known work: Did Monetary Forces Cause the Great Depression? (1976). This work hypothesized that it was not primarily the actions of the Federal Reserve in response to the economic downturn of 1930 which turned a recession into the most far reaching slump in the modern economic period, but instead was an autonomous drop in demand.  He would later revisit this thesis in his 1989 work Lessons from the Great Depression, as well as publish several papers building on his conclusions. He joined, in some way, the conclusions of Keynes and Friedman: the Great Depression started with troubles in the 'real economy' later expanded to the financial world via speculation and money destruction (also see the analysis of Rondo Cameron about 'wildcat banking').

His 1987 empirical survey of AT&T, entitled The Fall of the Bell System has affected how new entrepreneurial businesses are viewed.

Personal life
Temin is the brother of the late geneticist Howard Temin, who was awarded the Nobel Prize in Physiology and Medicine in 1975 for the discovery of reverse transcriptase. He is Jewish.

Selected publications 
Iron and Steel in Nineteenth Century America: An Economic Inquiry. Cambridge: M.I.T. Press, 1964.
The Jacksonian Economy. New York: W.W. Norton, 1969.
The New Economic History (ed.). Penguin Books, 1972.
Causal Factors in American Economic Growth in the Nineteenth Century. London: Macmillan, 1975.
Did Monetary Forces Cause the Great Depression? New York: W.W. Norton, 1976.
Reckoning with Slavery. New York: Oxford University Press, 1976 (with Paul David, Herbert Gutman, Richard Sutch, and Gavin Wright).
Taking Your Medicine: Drug Regulation in the United States. Cambridge: Harvard University Press, 1980.
The Fall of The Bell System: A Study in Prices and Politics. New York: Cambridge University Press, 1987.

 Inside the Business Enterprise: Historical Perspectives on the Use of Information (ed.). Chicago: University of Chicago Press, 1991.
 Industrialization in North America (ed.), Vol. 6 of R. A. Church and E. A. Wrigley (eds.), The Industrial Revolutions. Oxford: Blackwell, 1994.
 The European Economy Between the Wars. Oxford: Oxford University Press, 1997 (with Charles Feinstein and Gianni Toniolo), translated into Italian as L'economia europea tra le due guerre (Laterza, Roma-Bari 1998).
 Learning by Doing in Markets, Firms, and Nations (eds.). Chicago: University of Chicago Press, 1998 (with Naomi R. Lamoreaux and Daniel M. G. Raff).
 Elites, Minorities, and Economic Growth (eds.). Amsterdam: Elsevier, 1999 (with Elise S. Brezis).
 Engines of Enterprise: An Economic History of New England (ed.). Cambridge: Harvard University Press, 2000.
 The World Economy Between the Wars. Oxford: Oxford University Press, 2007 (with [Charles Feinstein and] Gianni Toniolo).
 Reasonable Rx: How to Lower Drug Prices. FT Press, 2008 (with Stan Finkelstein).

 Prometheus Shackled: Goldsmith Banks and England's Financial Revolution after 1700, Oxford University Press, USA, 2013 (with Hans-Joachim Voth).
 The Leaderless Economy: Why the World Economic System Fell Apart and How to Fix It, Princeton University Press, 2013 (with David Vines).
 Keynes: Useful Economics for the World Economy, co-author David Vines, MIT Press (2014) 
 The Vanishing Middle Class: Prejudice and Power in a Dual Economy, MIT Press (March 2017)

References

External links

American economists
Economic historians
1937 births
Living people
Massachusetts Institute of Technology alumni
MIT School of Humanities, Arts, and Social Sciences faculty
Swarthmore College alumni
Jewish American historians
American male non-fiction writers
Academics of the University of Cambridge
Fellows of the American Academy of Arts and Sciences
21st-century American Jews
Presidents of the Economic History Association